Carex humilis (also known as dwarf sedge) is a species of sedge that can be found in Western Europe.

References

External links
British Wild Flowers

humilis
Flora of Europe
Plants described in 1761